The following outline is provided as an overview of and topical guide to Rajasthan:

Rajasthan largest state of the Republic of India by area, is located in the northwest of India. It comprises most of the area of the large, inhospitable Thar Desert, also known as the Great Indian Desert, which parallels the Sutlej-Indus river valley along its border with Pakistan to the west. Rajasthan is also bordered by Gujarat to the southwest, Madhya Pradesh to the southeast, Uttar Pradesh and Haryana to the northeast and Punjab to the north. Rajasthan covers 10.4% of India, an area of 342,239 square kilometres (132,139 sq mi).

General reference

Names 
 Common English country name(s): Rajasthan
 Pronunciation
 
 
 Official name: State of Rajasthan
 Nickname(s): the land of kings
 Adjectival(s): Rajasthani
 Demonym(s): Rajasthanis
 Abbreviations and name codes
 ISO 3166-2 code:  IN-RJ
 Vehicle registration code: RJ

Rankings (amongst India's states) 

 by population: 7th
 by area (2011 census): 1st (largest state of India)
 by crime rate (2015): 6th
 by gross domestic product (GDP) (2104): 7th
by Human Development Index (HDI): 
by life expectancy at birth: 
by literacy rate: 25th

Geography of Rajasthan 

Geography of Rajasthan
 Rajasthan is: a state of India
 Population of Rajasthan: 68,621,012 (as of 2011)
 Area of Rajasthan:  342,239 km2 (132,139 sq mi)
 Atlas of Rajasthan

Location of Rajasthan 

Rajasthan is situated within the following regions:
 Eastern Hemisphere
 Northern Hemisphere
 Eurasia
 Asia
 South Asia
 Greater India
 Indian subcontinent
 India
 Northern India
 Time zone: Indian Standard Time (UTC+05:30)

Environment of Rajasthan 

 Climate of Rajasthan
 Western Rajasthan: Sub-tropical arid (desert) climate
 Rajasthan east of the Aravalli range: Sub-tropical humid (wet) with dry winters
 Wildlife of Rajasthan

Natural geographic features of Rajasthan 

Deserts of Rajasthan
Thar Desert
Rivers of Rajasthan
Luni River
Chambal River
Arvari River (Alwar)
Magan River
Banas River
Berach River
Bandi River
Banganga River
Bhagani River (Alwar)
Gambhir River
Ghaggar-Hakra River
Gomati River (Rajasthan)
Garri River
Sahibi river
Dohan river
Sota river
Kotkasim drain
Krishnavati river
Indori river
 Mountains of Rajasthan
Aravalli Range

Regions of Rajasthan 
There are mainly Four Regions of rajasthan.  

Dhundhar
Ahirwal
Mewat
Hadoti
Marwar
Gorwar
Mewar
Shekhawati
Bagar tract
 Vagad

Ecoregions of Rajasthan 

 Ghagghar planes in north 
 Very humid eastern planes
 Humid aravalli range 
 Semi-arid western planes 
 Arid far western thar dessert

Administrative divisions of Rajasthan 

Administrative divisions of Rajasthan
 Districts of Rajasthan
 Municipalities of Rajasthan

Districts of Rajasthan 

Districts of Rajasthan

Ajmer district
Alwar district
Banswara district
Baran district
Barmer district
Bharatpur district
Bhilwara district
Bikaner district
Bundi district
Chittorgarh district
Churu district
Dausa district
Dholpur district
Dungarpur district
Hanumangarh district
Jaipur district
Jaisalmer district
Jalor district
Jhalawar district
Jhunjhunu district
Jodhpur district
Karauli district
Kota district
Nagaur district
Pali district
Pratapgarh district
Rajsamand district
Sawai Madhopur district
Sikar district
Sirohi district
Sri Ganganagar district
Tonk district
Udaipur district

Municipalities of Rajasthan 

Municipalities of Rajasthan
 Capital of Rajasthan: Capital of Rajasthan
 Cities of Rajasthan

Demography of Rajasthan 

Demographics of Rajasthan

Government and politics of Rajasthan 

 Form of government: 
 Capital of Rajasthan: Capital of Rajasthan
 Elections in Rajasthan
 Political parties in Rajasthan
 Political scandals of Rajasthan
 Taxation in Rajasthan

Branches of the government of Rajasthan 

Government of Rajasthan

Executive branch of the government of Rajasthan 
 Governor
 List of Governors of Rajasthan
 Ministers in Government of Rajasthan
 Chief Minister
 Chief Ministers of Rajasthan
 Chief Secretaries of Rajasthan

State agencies of Rajasthan 

 Board of Secondary Education, Rajasthan 
 HCM Rajasthan State Institute of Public Administration 
 Jaipur Development Authority 
 Rajasthan Arabic and Persian Research Institute 
 Rajasthan Financial Corporation 
 Rajasthan Khadi and Village Industries Board 
 Rajasthan Oriental Research Institute 
 Rajasthan Public Service Commission 
 Rajasthan Rajya Vidyut Utpadan Nigam 
 Rajasthan State Archives 
 Rajasthan State Industrial Development and Investment Corporation 
 Rajasthan State Mines and Minerals Limited 
 Rajasthan State Road Transport Corporation 
 Rajasthan State Sports Council 
 Rajasthan Tourism Development Corporation 
 Rural Non Farm Development Agency 
 SPINFED

Legislative branch of the government of Rajasthan 
Speaker
List of Speakers of Rajasthan Legislative Assembly
Rajasthan Legislative Assembly
 Members of the Rajasthan Legislative Assembly (13th house)

Judicial branch of the government of Rajasthan 

 Rajasthan High Court
 Chief Justice
 List of Chief Justices of Rajasthan High Court

Law and order in Rajasthan 

Law of Rajasthan

 Capital punishment in Rajasthan
 Constitution of Rajasthan
 Criminal justice system of Rajasthan
 Crime in Rajasthan
 Organized crime in Rajasthan
 Human rights in Rajasthan
 Freedom of the press in Rajasthan
 Freedom of religion in Rajasthan
 LGBT rights in Rajasthan
 Law enforcement in Rajasthan
 Rajasthan Police
 Penal system of Rajasthan

History of Rajasthan 

History of Rajasthan
Timeline of history of Rajasthan
Current events of Rajasthan

History of Rajasthan, by period 
 Vedic and earlier cultures
 Sothi culture
 Ahar-Banas culture
 Ochre Coloured Pottery culture
 Black and red ware culture
 Painted Grey Ware
 Northern Black Polished Ware
 Rang Mahal culture
 Muslim conquest in the Indian subcontinent
 Caliphate campaigns in India (738 CE)

History of Rajasthan, by region

History of Rajasthan, by subject 
Rajputs
Jauhar
Prithviraj Chauhan
Maharana Pratap
Battle of Haldighati

Culture of Rajasthan 

Culture of Rajasthan
 Architecture of Rajasthan
 List of palaces in Rajasthan
 Cuisine of Rajasthan
 Ethnic minorities in Rajasthan
 Festivals in Rajasthan
 Humor in Rajasthan
 Media in Rajasthan
 Monuments of National Importance in Rajasthan
 Museums and art galleries in Rajasthan
 People of Rajasthan
 People from Rajasthan
 Prostitution in Rajasthan
 Public holidays in Rajasthan
 Records of Rajasthan
 Religion in Rajasthan
 Buddhism in Rajasthan
 Christianity in Rajasthan
 Hinduism in Rajasthan
 Islam in Rajasthan
 Jainism in Rajasthan
 Judaism in Rajasthan
 Sikhism in Rajasthan
 World Heritage Sites in Rajasthan

Art in Rajasthan 

 Art in Rajasthan
 Cinema of Rajasthan
 Films shot in Rajasthan
 Rajasthani-language films
 Literature of Rajasthan
 Music of Rajasthan
 Television in Rajasthan
 Theatre in Rajasthan

Language in Rajasthan
 Rajasthani language – language of the Indo-Aryan languages family. It is spoken by 20 million people in Rajasthan and neighboring states of India and Pakistan, or 50 million if Marwari if counted as Rajasthani, as it often is.
 Rajasthani language movement
Ahirwati
Bagri
Harauti
Marwari
Mewari
Mewati
 Other major languages and dialects
Shekhawati
 Dhatki
 Goaria
 Godwari
 Loarki
 Gade Lohar
 Gujari
 Gurgula
 Lambadi
 Malvi
 Nimadi

Sports in Rajasthan 

 Cricket in Rajasthan
 Rajasthan Cricket Association
 Rajasthan cricket team
 Rajasthan Royals
 Football in Rajasthan
 Rajasthan football team

Symbols of Rajasthan 

Symbols of Rajasthan
 State animal: Chinkara
 State bird: Indian bustard
 State flower: Rohira
 State seal: Seal of Rajasthan
 State tree:  Khejri

Economy and infrastructure of Rajasthan 

Economy of Rajasthan
 Economic rank (by nominal GDP): 
 Agriculture in Rajasthan
 Banking in Rajasthan
 Bank of Rajasthan
 Communications in Rajasthan
 Internet in Rajasthan
 Companies of Rajasthan
 Currency of Rajasthan: 
 Economic history of Rajasthan
 Energy in Rajasthan
 Energy policy of Rajasthan
 Oil industry in Rajasthan
 Health care in Rajasthan
 Mining in Rajasthan
 Rajasthan Stock Exchange
 Tourism in Rajasthan
 Transport in Rajasthan
 Airports in Rajasthan
 Rail transport in Rajasthan
 State highways in Rajasthan
 Water supply and sanitation in Rajasthan

Education in Rajasthan 

Education in Rajasthan
 List of schools in Rajasthan
 List of schools in Kota Rajasthan
 Institutions of higher education in Rajasthan
 Amity University Rajasthan
 Central University of Rajasthan
 Rajasthan College
 Rajasthan College of Engineering for Women
 University of Rajasthan
 University of Rajasthan Library
 Medical colleges in Rajasthan
 Rajasthan pharmacy college
 Rajasthan University of Health Sciences

Health in Rajasthan 

 Malnutrition in Rajasthan
 Water supply and sanitation in Rajasthan

See also 

 List of international rankings
 Outline of geography

 Ahore (Rajasthan Assembly constituency)
 Bali (Rajasthan Assembly constituency)
 Dr. Sarvepalli Radhakrishnan Rajasthan Ayurved University
 East Rajasthan Uplands
 Ganges Canal (Rajasthan)
 Gomati River (Rajasthan)
 HCM Rajasthan State Institute of Public Administration
 Historical battles of Rajasthan
 Jaga (Rajasthan)
 Jagadguru Ramanadacharya Rajasthan Sanskrit University
 Jagas of Rajasthan
 Jalore (Rajasthan Assembly constituency)
 Janardan Rai Nagar Rajasthan Vidyapeeth University
 List of constituencies of Rajasthan Vidhan Sabha
 List of Rajasthan Royals cricketers
 List of Rajya Sabha members from Rajasthan
 List of Sahitya Akademi Award winners for Rajasthani
 List of Scheduled castes in Rajasthan
 List of Speakers of Rajasthan Legislative Assembly
 List of State Protected Monuments in Rajasthan
 Major Rajasthani
 Pali (Rajasthan Assembly constituency)
 Parbati River (Rajasthan)
 Pathans of Rajasthan
 Political families of Rajasthan
 Raj Bhavan (Rajasthan)
 Rajasthan (film)
 Rajasthan Accounts Service
 Rajasthan Administrative Service
 Rajasthan Arabic and Persian Research Institute
 Rajasthan Assembly Building
 Rajasthan Atomic Power Station
 Rajasthan Basin
 Rajasthan Electronics and Instruments Limited
 Rajasthan High Court
 Rajasthan Institute of Engineering and Technology
 Rajasthan Khadi and Village Industries Board
 Rajasthan Legislative Assembly
 Rajasthan Nirman Mazdoor Sangathan
 Rajasthan Oriental Research Institute
 Rajasthan Patrika
 Rajasthan Pradesh Congress Committee
 Rajasthan Pre-Engineering Test
 Rajasthan Public Service Commission
 Rajasthan Rajya Vidyut Utpadan Nigam
 Rajasthan Roots
 Rajasthan Royals
 Rajasthan State Archives
 Rajasthan State Industrial Development and Investment Corporation
 Rajasthan State Mines and Minerals Limited
 Rajasthan State Road Transport Corporation
 Rajasthan State Sports Council
 Rajasthan Technical University
 Rajasthan Tourism Development Corporation
 Rajasthan Vikas Party
 Rajgarh (Rajasthan)
 Royal Rajasthan on Wheels
 Sai Dham Rani Rajasthan
 Shaikh of Rajasthan
 Sumerpur (Rajasthan Assembly constituency)
 Swami Keshwanand Rajasthan Agricultural University

References

External links 

 
 Portal of Rajasthan

Rajasthan
Rajasthan
 1